The Sand Butte Wilderness Study Area is a Bureau of Land Management wilderness study area (WSA) in Lincoln County, Idaho. The WSA is located to the south of Craters of the Moon National Monument and Preserve.

Sand Butte itself is located in the northeast corner of the WSA, and has a maximum elevation of 4974 feet.  It is not composed of sand, but basalt lava of Pleistocene age, of the Snake River Group.

The WSA is accessible only by unimproved roads and jeep trails, or by hiking.

Shale Butte Wilderness Study Area is to the south, and Raven's Eye Wilderness Study Area is adjacent to the north.

References

Protected areas of Lincoln County, Idaho
Protected areas established in 1992
Bureau of Land Management areas in Idaho
1992 establishments in Idaho